Jérôme Meyer (born May 31, 1979) is a French professional rock climber, specialising in bouldering. He in known for winning four Bouldering World Cups (2001, 2002, 2003, 2006).

Biographic notes 
Son of mountaineers, Meyer engaged in skiing, mountain trekking and mountain biking since when he was a child. When he was 12 years old, he joined the climbing gym in Chambéry.

He started competing in 1999 and throughout his career he won four Bouldering World Cups (2001, 2002, 2003, 2006).

He retired from international competitions in 2008, after the European Climbing Championship. Since then, he served as a director in the International Federation of Sport Climbing.

Rankings

Climbing World Cup

Climbing World Championships

Number of medals in the Climbing World Cup

Bouldering

See also
List of grade milestones in rock climbing
History of rock climbing
Rankings of most career IFSC gold medals

References

External links 

1979 births
Emlyon Business School alumni
French rock climbers
Living people
People from Lons-le-Saunier
Sportspeople from Jura (department)
IFSC Climbing World Championships medalists
IFSC Climbing World Cup overall medalists
Boulder climbers